The Ethiopian Higher League (Amharic: የኢትዮጵያ ከፍተኛ ሊግ), also called the Ethiopian Super League, is the second division of association football in Ethiopia. Regulated by the Ethiopian Football Federation, the league is divided into three groups (Group A, Group B, and Group C) with 12 clubs in each group. It operates on a system of promotion and relegation along with the Ethiopian Premier League (first division) and the Ethiopian First League (third division). The champions of Group A, B, and C will be automatically promoted to the Premier League. The bottom two teams (11th and 12th) of each respective group at the season's end will be relegated to the First League, the third division of Ethiopian football.

History 
After the 2016-17 season, Welwalo Adigrat University earned promotion to the Premier League by winning group A on 68 points with Mekelle City coming in second at 60 points. Jimma City won group B on 53 points and also earned promotion to the top league with Hadiya Hossana finishing second on 53 points. Mekelle City and Hadiya Hossana played in a one-game playoff to decide the third and final promotion out of the league, the game was won by Mekelle City (the club's first promotion into the Ethiopian Premier League).

The Ethiopian Football Federation (EFF) restructured the league into two groups A and B in the 2015/16 season. Group A comprises clubs from northern and central Ethiopia and Group B comprises clubs from Southern Ethiopia.

Fasil Kenema were crowned champions of the league after the 2015-16 season.

Bahir Dar Kenema and Debub Police S.C. were automatically promoted to the 2018-19 Ethiopian Premier League after winning their respective groups. Shire Endaselassie became the third and last club to be promoted to the 2018-19 Ethiopian Premier League after beating Jimma Aba Buna in a playoff match in Hawassa. 

During the 2020-21 season, some team were for forced to forfeit their matches due to unpaid payments to the league.

Teams

2020–21 season

The following 32 clubs will compete in the Higher League during the 2020-21 season.

Group A (የምድብ ሀ) 

Woldia
Ethio Electric 
 Legetafo Legedadi
Dessie City
 Semien Shewa Debre Birhan
Gelan City
 Federal Police
 Dessie City
 Wollo Kombolcha 

Group B (የምድብ ለ)
 Defence (Mekelakeya)
Akaki Kality
ECWCE
Kafa Bunna 
 Bench Maji Bunna
 Shashemene City 
 Jimma Aba Bunna
 Halaba City
Sodo City
 Hambericho Durame
Addis Ababa City
 Nekemte City
Gamo Chencha

Group C (የምድብ ሐ)

 Arba Minch City 
Kolfie Keranio
 Negelle Arsi
 Yeka (Addis Abeba)
Ethiopia Medin
 Kembata Shinshicho
Siltie Worabe
 Butajira City
Debub Police
Batu City
Gedeo Dilla
St. Kirkos (Addis Abeba)

2020–21 clubs' stadiums 

Clubs with stadiums with a capacity of at least 10,000:

References

Football leagues in Ethiopia